The ADAC, officially the Allgemeiner Deutscher Automobil-Club, is Europe's largest automobile association. The ADAC is the largest verein (club) in Germany, with around 21 million members. Its headquarters is located in Munich. Its original and most well-known service is roadside assistance.

The object of the ADAC is "the representation, promotion and advocacy of motoring, motorsport and tourism interests." The ADAC states that it represents the interests of motorists, though it also owns subsidiaries in different sectors such as insurance and publishing. These fourteen subsidiaries serve very different sectors, but all operate under ADAC Beteiligungs- und Wirtschaftsdienst GmbH, which assumes the holding function. Via its subsidiary ADAC Luftrettung, the ADAC operates the largest fleet of ambulance helicopters in Germany.

History
Founded on 24 May 1903, at the then-Hotel Silber in Stuttgart, the ADAC was originally named the Deutsche Motorradfahrer-Vereinigung (German Motorcyclist Association). Due to an enormous growth in membership of car owners, it was renamed the Allgemeiner Deutscher Automobil-Club (ADAC) in 1911. The Prussian eagle was selected as the emblem in the club's badge, in appreciation of the Prussian royal family's support and patronage. Its most senior figure at the time was German Emperor and King of Prussia Wilhelm II.

The ADAC breakdown assistance service was launched in Germany in 1927 under the name of ADAC-Straßen-Hilfsdienst.

After 1933, during Gleichschaltung, the Nazi Party amalgamated all motoring organisations in Germany into the DDAC (Der Deutsche Automobil-Club e.V.), an umbrella association that was allowed to exist in the shadow of the NSKK (National Socialist Motor Corps). A DDAC appeal described the 1934 international Automobile Exhibition as a "show for the people" rather than an "exhibition for the more affluent bourgeois segment" of society. "Motoring for the people" (Volkskraftfahrt), it proclaimed, was more "in the spirit of the Führer".

After business activities resumed in 1946, roadside assistance was revived in 1954 under the name ADAC-Straßenwacht ("road patrol"). In 1954 Heinz Frölich became the first of (in that year) 56 ADAC patrolmen equipped with a motorcycle and sidecar, the latter of which had a large compartment filled with tools and parts for roadside repairs. These original "Gelber Engel" ("Yellow Angels") used NSU Konsul motorcycles. At the end of 1962, ADAC announced the retirement of their motorbike-sidecar combinations, which would be replaced by 40 appropriately equipped Volkswagen Beetles.  Equipment on the new cars included a flashing roof light, repair tools, a radio communication device, compressed air canisters, a spade and broom set, and a basic "doctor kit" incorporating blood plasma.

In 1974, the organisation had 3.8 million members at a time when there were 19.0 million passenger cars registered in Germany. By 1990, membership had risen to 10.2 million, with 35.5 million passenger cars registered in the country, so ADAC membership grew more than twice as fast as national car ownership. Growth rates during the ensuing twenty years were greatly boosted by German reunification.

May 2012 was when the organisation welcomed its 18 millionth member, a further milestone being reached in May 2013 as the ADAC fitted out its 10,000th roadside assistance vehicle, a Volkswagen Touran, with several hundred different tools and replacement parts.

In 1997, ADAC opened its new technical centre in Landsberg am Lech, Bavaria.

In 2003, ADAC voiced criticism of the supervised driving at age 17 pilot program in Lower Saxony, and celebrated its 100th anniversary.

The ADAC Stiftung "Gelber Engel" foundation was established in 2007. This foundation financially supports survivors of road accidents, and funds accident rescue and accident research initiatives and institutions.

At the end of 2019, ADAC had 21.2 million members.

Operations 
According to its article of association, the ADAC's responsibilities lie in the "representation, promotion and advocacy of motoring, motorsport [...] interests" and is dedicated to road traffic, road safety, road safety education, tourism, and the protection of road users' rights. The ADAC works closely with its Austrian counterpart, Österreichischer Automobil-, Motorrad- und Touring Club (ÖAMTC), and is one of 78 select associations and federations in Germany eligible to file model declaratory actions (Musterfeststellungsklage).

Roadside assistance 
The primary service provided by ADAC is roadside assistance. The ADAC road patrol dates back to 1928, when the ADAC-Straßen-Hilfsdienst (ADAC Roadside Assistance Service) was established. Back then, the patrols used sidecar motorcycles. After World War II, during which ADAC was forced to stop operations, the provision of breakdown assistance services was resumed by establishing the ADAC Straßenwacht in 1954. In 1990, the road patrol started covering the New Länder. In 1951, the ADAC also started to organise assistance outside Germany.

The ADAC operates a fleet of more than 1,700 yellow road patrol vehicles, nicknamed "Yellow Angels". In the 1960s and 1970s, the yellow Volkswagen Beetles were a fixture on German roads. Today, the ADAC deploys MPVs, each carrying a myriad of tools, small parts, and replacement batteries. In the case of a car breakdown, members can request assistance over the phone, over the Internet, or via a smartphone app. The road patrol driver, sent by a dispatcher, will call the member several minutes before arrival.

ADAC also provides Europe-wide breakdown assistance for HGVs. In Germany, ADAC uses special breakdown assistance vehicles for HGVs. In other European countries, ADAC partners provide assistance.

In 2021, road patrols and ADAC mobility partners were dispatched in 3.5 million cases. In keeping with the previous years, the breakdowns were usually due to problems with the battery.

ADAC Stiftung "Gelber Engel" 
The ADAC Stiftung "Gelber Engel" ("ADAC 'Yellow Angel' Foundation") has supported victims of road accidents since 2007. It is also used to fund research considered by ADAC to improve road safety. In September 2013, the foundation was registered as a gGmbH (a non-profit company).

Air rescue and medical services 
The ADAC operates 55 air ambulance helicopters for urgent medical rescues in Germany, strategically placed so that any location can be reached within 15 minutes. Air ambulance jets are used by the ADAC to serve "Plus" members or ADAC international travel insurance customers from any location worldwide in the case of an accident or extreme illness. The ADAC also offers membership to non-German residents, having signed contracts with automobile clubs worldwide. In the UK, it is possible to have breakdown recovery through the local AA while having an ADAC membership.

ADAC Luftrettung ("Air Rescue") gGmbH is the largest civilian rotor-wing air medical organisation in Germany, followed by DRF Luftrettung.

In an extension of its helicopter ambulance operations, the ADAC holds shares in Aero-Dienst, which enables it to operate a small fleet of fixed-wing ambulance aircraft for mid-range medical repatriation.

Other services

Emergency key service 
As of January 2019, ADAC members can call for assistance when they have locked themselves out of their homes. This is possible in a pilot project running in the urban areas of Munich, Berlin, and Hamburg.

Ridesharing 
The ADAC ridesharing club (Mitfahrclub) is a platform for ridesharing.

Tourism 
The ADAC offers a variety of tourism and travel-related information. ADAC tourism advisors also provide suggested tours for motorcyclists and drivers of historic vehicles.

In the course of German reunification, ADAC joined forces with the conservancy Schutzgemeinschaft Deutscher Wald ("Alliance for the Protection of German Forests") and the German tourism association Deutscher Tourismusverband to have the 2,500 kilometres Deutsche Alleenstraße tree-lined holiday route running the length of Germany designated as such.

Testing and technical services 
To bolster its means to conduct independent consumer protection research, the ADAC established its own technical centre at Landsberg am Lech near Munich in 1997. Technical tests regularly include cars, tyres, child restraint systems, pedelecs, safety helmets, and accessories such as roof boxes. New products and technologies are tested as soon as they become available. The German Federal Motor Transport Authority recognised the facility as compliant with the DIN EN ISO/IEC 17025 standard. The testing operations are certified to ISO 9001:2015.

Research

The ADAC is an active member of the European Road Assessment Program (EuroRAP) in Germany. The ADAC regularly publishes maps showing safety characteristics of German roads. These maps, based on EuroRAP's Road Protection Score Protocol (or Star Rating Protocol), are a measure of how well a road protects road users in the event of an accident. Data on road characteristics is gathered by driving through road inspections using a specially equipped inspection vehicle. Assessors then produce a safety star rating, which is comparable across Europe.

The ADAC also undertakes road inspections on behalf of other EuroRAP members, including the Road Safety Foundation in the UK.

Motorsport 
Both the ADAC and its older competitor Automobilclub von Deutschland (AvD; the organizer of the German Grand Prix), are members of the FIA and the DMSB. The European Grand Prix, the former ADAC Eifelrennen, the 24 Hours Nürburgring and many other races are hosted by ADAC.

On June 3, 2008, the ADAC suspended its involvement with the FIA over the scandal surrounding Max Mosley and his subsequent retention as FIA president.

ADAC Stiftung Sport 
ADAC Stiftung Sport is a foundation set up in 1998 to promote and support German racing talent. Young racers showing potential are offered the opportunity to benefit from the support of experts and partners of the foundation. In addition to material backing, grantees are also eligible to benefit from training and coaching in many fields. In addition, the foundation also devotes funds to increasing motorsport safety and supporting non-professional racers injured in accidents.

Public relations 
ADAC is among Germany's most influential associations and one of the biggest lobbying associations worldwide. Public relations activities focus on topics such as maintaining motorised mobility, traffic laws and fines, and road safety education. In recent years, ADAC has developed a growing interest in other transport operators and modes, for instance, by conducting tests on local public transport and urban cycling.

The ADAC publishes ADAC Motorwelt, one of the largest magazines in Germany. The magazine is distributed four times a year to ADAC members, and features articles of common interest to all participants of public traffic, such as product tests, safe driving tips, and places to visit by car or motorcycle. Starting in 2020, ADAC Motorwelt is available to membership card holders at local ADAC offices, travel agencies, and driver safety locations, as well as Edeka and Netto supermarkets.

Road safety advocacy 
In 2006, ADAC published a series of critical press releases on the issue of "driving licence shopping" – getting a driving license in another country after having one's licence revoked in their home country – and advocated the speedy harmonisation of driver licensing in Europe.

Some ADAC positions are very controversial, questioning the benefit for road safety of some planned measures or rather implying the opposite. The club had argued its opposition to a general speed limit on German motorways by citing the finding that statistically, the motorways are already the safest roads in Germany in terms of accidents, and that a speed limit would not significantly reduce the severity of accidents. In light of an ambivalent opinion among both the public at large and ADAC members with regard to a general speed limit on German motorways, ADAC is "nicht mehr grundsätzlich" ("no longer in principle") against Autobahn speed limits and ceased making recommendations to policymakers on the issue as of 2020.

Campaigns 
The European Campaign for Safe Road Design is a partnership between 28 major European road safety stakeholders that is calling for the European Commission to invest in safe road infrastructure initiatives. ADAC is the campaign's partner in Germany.

Organisation 
In 2016, ADAC restructured its organisation, implementing a 3-pillar structure comprising an association (ADAC e.V.), a societas Europaea (ADAC SE) and a foundation (ADAC Stiftung). This structure was adopted by the vote of 200 delegates during a General Assembly in late 2014, and finalised in detail in 2015. At the 2016 ADAC General Assembly in Lübeck, the delegates agreed to the reorganised structure. This structure was fully implemented by early 2017.

ADAC e.V. provides core membership benefits such as roadside assistance and legal services, and is the home of functions such as consumer advocacy, motorsport, tourism, and the club magazine ADAC Motorwelt. The ADAC e.V. Executive Board is the renumerated executive body responsible for the club's management.

Commercial activities have been devolved to ADAC SE, an autonomous public company limited by shares that is separate from the association. ADAC e.V. holds a 57.74% majority of ADAC SE shares. Other shareholders include the ADAC foundation (25.10%) and, via private equity companies, several ADAC regional clubs (17.16%).

The ADAC foundation pools ADAC's charitable and public benefit activities. The foundation's objectives include the promotion and support of rescue in life-threatening situations, accident prevention, scholarship & research, education, and charity.

General Assembly 
The ADAC General Assembly convenes annually. Every four years, it elects the members of the ADAC Committee. The General Assembly is composed of the delegates of the regional clubs, the members of the ADAC Administrative Council, and an ADAC Committee. One delegate represents 100,000 regional club members (or a fraction thereof). By unanimous vote, the Committee may bestow honorary membership on persons from Germany or abroad in recognition of special merits in the cause of motoring. They enjoy the same rights and privileges as regular members.

In a General Assembly on December 6, 2014, August Markl was elected ADAC President. Over 200 delegates at the General Assembly at the Nürburgring in May 2019 elected Ulrich Klaus Becker as Vice President, Karsten Schulze as Technical Services President, Gerhard Hillebrand as Transport President, and Jens Kuhfuß as Finance President. With President August Markl, ADAC Sport President Hermann Tomczyk, and Tourism President Kurt Heinen, they form the newly constituted seven-strong ADAC Committee. The term of office of the Committee members is four years, with re-elections allowed. Committee meetings are attended by the Chief Legal Advisor.

The General Assembly in Munich in November 2019 adopted a new Premium membership, which adds numerous features to the existing Plus membership, adjusted membership fees for the available tiers, and adopted generally amended Articles of Association. The aim of the amendments was to better differentiate between the club's executive and advisory bodies and convey a clear assignment of responsibilities.

In 2021, the General Assembly elected Christian Reinicke as ADAC President, Gerd Ennser as ADAC Sport President, and Karlheinz Jungbeck as ADAC Tourism President.

ADAC Administrative Council 
The ADAC Administrative Council is composed of the members of the Committee and the 18 chairmen of the Regional Clubs (or their deputies in the Regional Club Boards). Decisions of the Administrative Council are binding towards all Regional Clubs.

Affiliations 
The ADAC is affiliated with the following organisations:

 The FIA, the international automobile federation
 The FIVA, the international historic vehicles federation
 Euro NCAP, a crash test consortium
 Pro Mobilität, a Berlin-based lobbying organisation promoting the expansion and maintenance of the road network
 The European Movement Germany network
 EuropeNet24, a Europe-wide breakdown assistance network for large goods vehicles

Financial reports 
The club had a yield of €911 million (profit €25 million) in 2014; the ADAC holding company ADAC Beteiligungs- und Wirtschaftsdienst GmbH had a yield of €1,004 million (profit €84.9 million) in 2014.

ADAC e.V. in 2019 
For fiscal year 2019, ADAC e.V.'s earnings year from membership stood at €10.1 million. Including financial and holdings earnings, the club's annual result was €43.7 million. In addition to the dividend paid out by ADAC SE, the legal entity reuniting all ADAC commercial activities, continuous membership growth, and an efficiency program positively impacted the annual result.

Thanks to the continued positive development of membership numbers, ADAC e.V.'s income from membership fees and the co-financing of membership benefits grew by €22.6 million from the previous year to reach €836.3 million in 2019. As in previous years, the bulk of this income (€631 million) was spent on assistance services. At the end of 2020, ADAC e.V. had 20.2 million members.

See also
 Breakdown (vehicle)
 Breakdown Cover
 European Campaign for Safe Road Design
 EuroRAP

References

External links

Official website 
 

Financial services companies established in 1903
Automobile associations
Road transport in Germany
Road safety organizations
Transport organisations based in Germany
Emergency road services